Clube Atlético Monte Líbano, abbreviated as C.A. Monte Líbano and CAML, is a Brazilian men's professional basketball club that is based in São Paulo, Brazil.

History
C.A. Monte Líbano won the regional São Paulo State Championship three times, and the national Brazilian Championship title 5 times. They also won the South American Club Championship twice.

Honors and titles

Worldwide
 FIBA Intercontinental Cup
 Runners-up (1): 1985

Continental
 South American Club Championship
 Champions (2): 1985, 1986
 Runners-up (2): 1983, 1987

National
 Brazilian Championship
 Champions (5): 1982, 1985, 1986 (I), 1986 (II), 1987

Regional
 São Paulo State Championship
 Champions (3): 1982, 1984, 1986
 Runners-up (3): 1981, 1985, 1987

Notable players

 Eduardo Agra
 Israel Andrade
 Marcel de Souza
 Maury de Souza
 Rolando Ferreira
 Jorge Guerra
 Ricardo Guimarães
 André Stoffel
 João Vianna
 Gerson Victalino
 Paulinho Villas Boas
 Fefo Ruiz
 Rocky Smith
 Ray Townsend

Head coaches
 Amaury Pasos
 Edvar Simões

References

External links
Official website 
LatinBasket.com Team Profile

Basketball teams in Brazil
Basketball teams in São Paulo